Charles Nkazamyampi (born November 1, 1964) is a retired middle-distance runner from Burundi. The 1992 African champion, he was unable to compete at the 1992 Summer Olympics because Burundi did not participate. In 1993 he won a silver medal in 800 metres at the World Indoor Championships, finishing behind Tom McKean. Nkazamyampi later competed at the 1996 Summer Olympics without reaching the final.

His personal best time over 800 metres was 1:44.24 minutes, achieved in 1993.

Post-Career Activities 
Charles is the creator of 'Foundation Charles Nkazamyampi' (FCN), which uses sport to unite communities and promote peace throughout the nation of Burundi. They work in 8 provinces across Burundi and encourage youth to sign peace pledges to try and stem possible future violence.

References

External links

Foundation Charles Nkazamyampi

1964 births
Living people
Burundian male middle-distance runners
Athletes (track and field) at the 1996 Summer Olympics
Olympic athletes of Burundi
20th-century Burundian people
21st-century Burundian people